Jordan Crowther (born 19 February 1997) is an English rugby league footballer who plays as a  and  for Wakefield Trinity in the Super League. 

He has spent time on loan from Wakefield at the York City Knights, Oxford and Newcastle Thunder in League 1, and the Dewsbury Rams in the Championship.

Background
Crowther was born in Wakefield, West Yorkshire, England.

His amateur club were the Westgate Wolves, and Crigglestone all blacks, both in Wakefield. Jordan and his family have always been supporters of his home town club Wakefield Trinity RLFC.

Career
Jordan joined the club as a scholarship player and progressed through the Wakefield Trinity Academy system. He made his first team début against the Wigan Warriors in March 2014 and is the second-youngest forward ever to play for the club. From 2014 to 2018 Crowther was loaned out to lower league clubs including two stints at Dewsbury Rams, this is not unusual in the development of a young forward. In the 2019 season Crowther cemented his place as a regular in the back row and in turn gained a new contract at the club after a number of strong performances at Loose Forward.

International career
Jordan represented England Academy against France Under-18s at Stade Albert Domec, Carcassonne. Jordan has also played for England U16s.

References

External links
Wakefield Trinity profile
SL profile
Wakefield Trinity: Crowther re-signs for Trinity who are looking to add forward King

1997 births
Living people
Dewsbury Rams players
English rugby league players
Newcastle Thunder players
Oxford Rugby League players
Rugby league props
Rugby league players from Wakefield
Wakefield Trinity players
York City Knights players